Vanessa Hau Mdee (born 7 June 1988), is a Tanzanian singer, rapper, television personality and radio host. Mdee is popularly known for being the first ever Tanzanian MTV VJ. She later rose to prominence as a radio and TV host, hosting Epic Bongo Star Search and Dume Challenge for ITV Tanzania before signing to B'Hits Music Group in late 2012.

After joining B'hits Music Group, Mdee collaborated with Tanzanian rapper A.Y. on a record Money and Ommy Dimpoz, a Bongo Flava artist on a record Me and You that was later voted Song of the Year during the 2013 Kilimanjaro Music Awards. She received an even bigger buzz with the release of her first solo single "Closer", which in its first week was downloaded over 30,000 times, a feat achieved by no other Tanzanian artist. "Closer" remained on the charts for over 13 weeks.

Vanessa has had the chance to interview many artists, such as K'Naan, Kelly Rowland, French Montana, Mac Miller, Rick Ross, Ludacris, Miguel, Donald, Nazizi, Xtatic, Stella Mwangi, Camp Mulla, Tay Grin, Teargas and many more African and international acts. In 2015 and 2016, she released three singles ("Nobody But Me", "Never Ever" and "Niroge") which were also received well. In 2018, she was signed to  Universal Music Group.

Early life and education 
Vanessa Mdee was born on 7 June 1988 in Arusha, the third-largest city in Tanzania. Mdee became familiar with various cultures after growing up in New York, Paris, Nairobi and Arusha. She obtained her secondary and high level education at Arusha Modern High School. Mdee attended university at the Catholic University of Eastern Africa to pursue a law degree. Mdee quickly became familiar with many different forms of creative and performing arts.

Career

2007: MTV VJ Search 
In early 2007, Mdee got the chance to audition for The MTV VJ Search in Dar es Salaam. Afterwards, she joined Carol and Kule to host the Coca-Cola Chart Express.  By 2008, Mdee had established herself in Tanzania and around the continent, hosting shows in Nigeria, South Africa, Kenya, Mozambique, Angola, Uganda, and the Democratic Republic of Congo. She also became known in the United States and Brazil.

2008: MTV Staying Alive 
In 2008, Mdee worked with the Staying Alive Foundation on a project close to her heart. She got to visit the Uwanja wa Fisi with then-Staying Alive Foundation Special Ambassador Kelly Rowland. Mdee also joined Malaria No More in their Z!nduka Campaign, a campaign aimed at the eradication of malaria.

2009 
In early 2009 Mdee hosted Senses, Sounds and Wisdom with Zantel during the annual Sauti Za Busara International Music Festival, showcasing the ever-growing Swahili culture. Mdee's fashion sense has made her the go-to girl at every MTV Africa Music Awards. She hosted the red carpet event for three years in a row.

2011: Choice FM Tanzania and other media projects 
In 2011, Mdee's became the host of 102.5 Choice FM's The Hitlist. As host, Mdee played R&B, Hip-Hop, and Pop. She also interviewed many artists, such as K'Naan, Kelly Rowland, Mac Miller, Rick Ross, Ludacris, Miguel, Donald, Naazizi, Xtatic, Stella Mwangi, Camp Mulla, Tay Grin, Teargas, Dr. Sid and many more African and international acts.

Along with her pan-African weekly TV show, MTV's Base Select 10 and daily radio gig, Mdee blogged as a roving reporter on behalf of MTV Staying Alive and UNAIDS on her Dynamites Mission website. She was MTV's voice at the 2011 UNAIDS Mali Youth Summit in Bamako and the subsequent High Level meeting in Cape Town, South Africa, She participated in the International Conference on HIV and STI's in Addis Ababa, Ethiopia, and cofounded (along with M. K. Asante) STANDWIDTH, under the UNAIDS umbrella. Damian Kimt.

2012: MTV Base Meets and music premier 
In 2012 Mdee hosted MTV Base Meets, a show geared towards empowering young Africans from around the world by giving them the rare opportunity to sit down with an influential leader. MTV Base Meets brought her in the company of Russell Simmons, Alek Wek, former President of Nigeria Hon. Olusegun Obasanjo, football star Emmanuel Adebayor and Akon. Mdee also hosted the Kili Music Awards (Tanzania's music awards) as well as Tanzania's nationwide talent search Epiq Bongo Star Search (EBSS). Mdee is currently working on her new web series Vee World Wide, about her travels and encounters with various celebrities from around the world. People who have appeared on Vee World Wide include Keke Palmer, Carol Rodrigues, Da Internz, Keyshia Knight Pulliam, Letoya Luckett, DWoods, GOOD Music's D'Banj and many more. Mdee was asked to audition for BET's 106 & Park, although she did not get the gig.

Also in 2012, Mdee was awarded at a gala in New York City by the UNA-YP (United Nations Association of Young Professionals) for being an African change maker. In the same month she was awarded by the GAVI Alliance for her support in the initiation of free vaccinations for Tanzanian children. In May 2013, Mdee was invited to speak at the World Economic Forum for Africa in Cape Town, South Africa on behalf of the GAVI Alliance on the announcement of the new record low price for the Human Papillomavirus (HPV) vaccines. Later that same month, Mdee again spoke on cervical cancer at the Global Forum for Cervical Cancer Prevention in Kuala Lumpur, Malaysia on behalf of Global Health Strategies. Mdee officially became a GAVI Ambassador and an active voice against cervical cancer.

Mdee launched her music career in 2012, working on the single "Me and You" by Ommy Dimpoz. A month later 13 January 2013 – she released her first single "Closer". These scored her four nominations at Tanzania's Music Awards (Kilimanjaro Tanzania Music Awards), including "Bongo Pop Song of the year", which she won. She also won Collaboration of the Year.

2013 
In, 2013 Mdee got added to the Dar es Salaam hub of the World Economic Forum as a Global Shaper. In October 2013 Mdee joined the GAVI Alliance again at the UN General Assembly where she spoke on a panel with Yoweri Museveni, President of Uganda. This trip ended with Mdee closing the NASDAQ by ringing the ceremonial closing bell, along with UNAIDS Executive Director Michel Sidibe and Ibrahim Boubacar Keita, President of Mali. Mdee was in turn awarded by the Global Health and Diplomacy for her work in advocacy.

Mdee hosted MTV Base's Hunters Oasis; a music festival around Africa with appearances from some of the African continents hottest artists and DJs. She also hosted Tanzania's Epiq Bongo Star Search Season 7 and Dume Challenge, seasons 1 and 2. Mdee also released her second single "Come Over" in November 2013 which has been on charts in Tanzania, Nigeria, Uganda, Kenya etc.

2014: Music, Awards, Airtel, Coke Studio, Crown Paints, Music Tours 
In 2014, Mdee was nominated for 3 Kilimanjaro Tanzania Music Awards for Female Artist of the Year, R&B Song of the Year and Female Performer of the Year. On 3 May 2014, she won for R&B Song of the Year for Closer. Mdee released her third single Hawajui on 13 June.

'Switch On' Airtel Campaign; Vanessa Mdee is involved in the 'Switch On' campaign by Airtel that is about connecting users to the internet and charged according to the kind of device in use.

MTV Africa Music Awards; Vanessa Mdee alongside Nomuzi Mabena presented the Best Collaboration Award and Best Francophone Award. During the trip to Durban, South Africa she as an MTV VJ had an opportunity to sit down and interview Trey Songz, Miguel and French Montana all artists from the U.S.

Coke Studio Africa; Vanessa Mdee features in season II of Coke Studio Africa where she collaborates and performs with Nigeria's Burna Boy.

Kili Music Tour; Vanessa Mdee was among the artists that graced the Kili Music Tour 2014 stage in Mwanza and the finale in Dar es Salaam.
Serengeti Fiesta Music Tour 2014 – Sambaza Upendo (Swahili for 'Spread Love'); Vanessa Mdee was on Tanzania's biggest nationwide music tour, covering various regions. The tour final took place on Saturday, 18 October 2014 in Dar es Salaam where American rapper T.I graced the stage; other acts included Diamond, Davido, Waje, Victoria Kimani, Patoranking to name a few.

Vanessa Mdee received an endorsement deal from Crown Paints, to be its brand ambassador in Tanzania. Crown Paints is a number one paint manufacturing company in Eastern Africa.

AFRIMA Awards; Vanessa Mdee nominated for two categories: Best Female Artiste in Eastern Africa and Best African RNB & Soul in the All Africa Music Awards. On 27 December, Vanessa Mdee won Best Female Artiste in Eastern Africa award in Lagos, Nigeria.

On 8 November, Vanessa Mdee joined forces with another Tanzanian songbird Barnaba Elias to release their latest up tempo Afro Pop duet Siri. It tells the tale of a cunning young man who tries to convince a young bride to embark on a love affair with him, with promises of plenty material things. Despite her upbringing the story ends at a crossroads, leaving the listener wondering. Siri is already rising fast on the Tanzania radio charts plus East African charts. Later on 8 December, the much anticipated video for Hawajui was premiered on MTV Base and has gone on to capture the attention of the African continent and beyond.

2015: Samsung, ESSENCE, ONE.org, Awards 

Early this year, Vanessa Mdee signed a brand ambassadorship deal with Samsung Tanzania. Vanessa has continued to attract a lot of attention from plenty of corporations due to her enormous talent and continued effort to grow her brand.

On 26 March 2015, Vanessa Mdee released her fifth single Nobody But Me where she joins with heavy hitting South African rapper K.O on. Composed by Vanessa Mdee, Ntokozo Mdluli and Nahreel, the light hearted collabo will transcend from the airwaves to the club. Nobody But Me is already topping charts in various countries in Africa.

On 4 April 2015, Mdee performed in Lagos, Nigeria at the Gidi Culture Festival known to be Africa's biggest beach festival, that was presented by Eclipse Live and Lagos State. The festival was held at Eko Atlantic. Vanessa Mdee shared the stage with some of the continent's top artists like Burna Boy, Awilo Longomba, M.I, Waje, Sean Tizzle, Victoria Kimani, Efya, Skales and many more. Vanessa Mdee was the only artist representing Tanzania at the festival.

Mdee is up for three Kilimanjaro Music Awards i.e. Female Artist of the Year, Female Entertainer of the Year and Afropop Song of the Year. The awards are set to take place 15 June 2015 in Dar es Salaam, Tanzania. Vanessa Mdee's also nominated for Favorite Female Artist at Tanzania's People's Choice Awards Tuzo Za Watu that take place on 22 May 2015 in Dar es Salaam.

On 13 May 2015, Mdee joined forces with arguably seven of Africa's most popular songstresses for ONE mission and ONE mission only – Celebrating girl power! The campaign is calling on world leaders to put girls and women in the forefront in 2015. This is the year when the new development goals will be set by world leaders at the United Nations. Apart from Vanessa Mdee, the other artists are Victoria Kimani (Kenya), Judith Sephuma (South Africa), Waje (Nigeria), Arielle T (Gabon), Gabriela (Mozambique), Yemi Alade (Nigeria), Selomor Mtukudzi (Zimbabwe) and Blessing Nwafor. The song promotes the Poverty is Sexist Campaign globally, and will be officially launched in Nigeria, Mozambique, Zimbabwe and South Africa during the World Economic Forum for Africa and the African Union Heads of State Summit. The song is released in conjunction with a report by ONE titled, "Poverty is Sexist: Why girls and women must be at the heart of the fight to end extreme poverty". The report shows how unlocking women's economic potential could improve the lives of everyone in society. It also illustrates the structural nature of the social, economic, political and cultural barriers that militate against women and girls. The campaign has a petition which is calling on world leaders to track the fight against inequality and injustice by investing more in women and girls if the world is to end extreme poverty by 2030.

On 23 June 2015, Mdee took home two KTMA Awards for Female Artist of the Year and Best Female Entertainer. The awards were held in Dar es Salaam, Tanzania – which takes place every year.

Essence a popular US magazine – hadn't shot a cover in Africa since 1978. They decided it was time. They travelled to East Africa and photographed Erykah Badu in Zanzibar, Tanzania and Nairobi, Kenya for the August issue. Vanessa Mdee features in this Essence issue where she opens up about Tanzania, her music, inspiration and many more.

2016: Music, Mombasa Rocks, One Africa Music Fest, Fiesta Tour 
The Mombasa Rocks festival was held at the Mombasa Golf Club – Kenya on 8 October 2016. Vanessa Mdee delivering an electrifying performance was among the headliners that featured international singing sensation Chris Brown, Nigeria's Wizkid, Tanzania's Alikiba and others.

Fiesta Tour: Vanessa among other Tanzanian music artists have been touring various cities in the country. Vanessa has performed in Dodoma, Morogoro, Arusha and is set to perform at the finale in Dar es Salaam.

One Africa Music Festival: Vanessa performed live at the Toyota Center – Houston on Saturday, 22 October 2016. This unforgettable night featured Africa's finest such as Nigerian afrobeats stars 2Face, Banky W, P-Square, Dbanj, Olamide, Flavour, Kcee, Harrysongs, DR Congolese Fally Ipupa, South African duo Mafikizolo, East Africa's Vanessa Mdee, and many more.

East Africa's Got Talent 

In July 2019, Vanessa Mdee was unveiled as one of the four pioneer judges for the debut season of East Africa's Got Talent, which began airing in August 2019.

Money Mondays 
Vanessa Mdee released her debut album 'Money Mondays' on 15 January 2018. The album consists eighteen tracks, two as bonus and sixteen as official tracks. Including Bambino ft. Reekado Banks, Cash Madame, Bounce and Kisela ft. P Squares's Peter.

Money Mondays broke many records in East African Music history, a report announced by African most loved music streaming platform BoomPlay.

MTV Shuga 
Vanessa Mdee appeared on MTV Shuga Down South several episodes as Stormi the glam madam.

Personal life 
Vanessa Mdee has been rumoured to have been in a number of romantic relationships but the only confirmed relationship is with her now ex, Tanzanian music star, Juma Jux. The pair were in a relationship for six years before the final breakup in 2018 which they mutually agreed to keep secret before Vanessa revealed the news in an interview in 2019. Juma Jux later revealed in an interview that his first breakup with the singer was as a result of a picture of Vanessa with Nigerian rapper, Ice Prince, with the two looking cozy. Vanessa was also linked to a rumoured romantic relationship with American superstar, Trey Songz, which she later refuted in an interview.

On 25 November 2019, Rotimi, popularly known by his character, Andre, in the popular TV series, Power, shared a picture of him and Vanessa posing in an elevator on date night, with Vanessa also confirming their relationship by posting the same picture with a different caption. Rotimi told the story of how the two met at a party and hit it off  and Vanessa also said in an interview how she knew he was her husband, only two days after meeting him. In a video posted on Instagram with Rotimi who was later joined by Vanessa, the pair revealed that they both had tattoos of each other's name on their bodies; her (middle) name, Hau, on his right wrist and his name, Rotimi, on her chest. They also have matching tattoos of the number 1045 on their wrists.

In December 2020, Vanessa announced her engagement to Rotimi by posting a video of her diamond ring on Instagram along with a long caption. The pair was expecting their first child together. It was announced with a series of maternity photos. On 29 September 2021, they welcomed a boy. They were expecting another child and Vanessa confirmed via her Instagram that it was a girl.

Discography

Awards and nominations

References

External links

 
 
 

1988 births
African Christians
American music industry executives
Living people
Midwest hip hop musicians
Tanzanian women rappers
21st-century Tanzanian women singers
Kisima Music Award winners
Alumni of Strathmore School
Interscope Records artists
Atlantic Records artists
Roc Nation artists
People from Arusha Region
Swahili-language singers
Tanzanian musicians
 Tanzanian Bongo Flava musicians